Guru Nanak College (GTB nagar) Mumbai, college in gtb nagar of Mumbai
Guru Nanak College Ground, a cricket ground in Velachery, Chennai.
Guru Nanak College, Chennai, a college in Velachery, Chennai, India.
Guru Nanak College, Budhlada, a college in Budhlada, Punjab, India.
Guru Nanak Khalsa College of Arts, Science & Commerce
Guru Nanak National College, Nakodar